Kannonzaki Park is a prefectural-level combined -city park, located at Cape Kannon (Kannonzaki), the northeastern tip of the Miura Peninsula, Yokosuka City, Kanagawa, Japan. It is a park that makes the most of the rich nature, such as the laurel forest and the coastal rocky shore of the area.

In its 70.2-hectare area are found: the park management center, the Kannonzaki Lighthouse, the Yokosuka Museum of Art, the Kannonzaki Nature Museum, a day camp site, the coastal and hill trails, etc.

The visitors to this park can enjoy "Ship watching", as it is located on the Uraga Channel, Japan's busiest sea lane.

See also 
Ship watching
Local attractions of Yokosuka

References

External links 

Prefectural Kannonzaki Park (Kanagawa Prefecture) (in Japanese)

Parks and gardens in Kanagawa Prefecture
Yokosuka, Kanagawa